Amata pyrocoma  is a species of moth of the family Erebidae first described by Edward Meyrick in 1886. It is found in Australia.

References 

Pyrocoma
Moths described in 1886
Moths of Australia